South Sea Love is a 1923 American silent drama film directed by David Selman, which stars Shirley Mason, J. Frank Glendon, and Francis McDonald. The screenplay was written by Harrison Josephs, based on a short story by Fanny Hatton and Frederick Hatton, which appeared in the March 1923 edition of Young's Magazine.

Plot
As described in a film magazine review, Captain Medina's daughter Dolores meets British trader Gerald Wilton aboard her father's ship. When the Captain dies, Wilton promises to take care of Dolores. When she learns that Wilton is already married, the young woman runs away and becomes a dancer in a tropical café. When his wife dies, Wilton finds that he is now free to rejoin Dolores. When he finds her, she rejects him. Her father's friends then combine to grab Wilton and hang him, but Dolores intervenes to save him. Dolores and Wilton are reconciled.

Cast

References

External links
 
 
 
 Lobby card at www.alamy.com
  south seas cinema; a site devoted to island films

Melodrama films
Fox Film films
American silent feature films
Films directed by David Selman
1923 drama films
1923 films
Silent American drama films
American black-and-white films
1920s English-language films
1920s American films